Salt Sulphur Springs is an unincorporated community in Monroe County, West Virginia, United States. Salt Sulphur Springs is located on U.S. Route 219, southwest of Union.

The community originally was a resort spa with two mineral springs. In 1985, seven buildings and two other structures qualified as contributing properties were listed on the National Register of Historic Places as a historic district, the "Salt Sulphur Springs Historic District."

References

Unincorporated communities in Monroe County, West Virginia
Unincorporated communities in West Virginia
National Register of Historic Places in Monroe County, West Virginia
Spa towns in West Virginia